Anthene juanitae, the Juanita's hairtail, is a butterfly of the family Lycaenidae. It is found in South Africa (Limpopo). It is found in dense riverine vegetation along the Olifants River.

The wingspan is about 25 mm in males and 27–29 mm in females.

References

Butterflies described in 1993
Anthene
Endemic butterflies of South Africa